Vincent Mbarga Manga (born 5 September 1991) is a retired Cameroonian football striker.

References

1991 births
Living people
Cameroonian footballers
Union Douala players
CRB Aïn Fakroun players
Royal Eagles F.C. players
Coton Sport FC de Garoua players
Association football forwards
Algerian Ligue Professionnelle 1 players
Cameroonian expatriate footballers
Expatriate footballers in Algeria
Cameroonian expatriate sportspeople in Algeria
Expatriate soccer players in South Africa
Cameroonian expatriate sportspeople in South Africa